Francis Ferguson Slaven (3 March 1931 – September 2007) was a Zimbabwean first-class cricketer and conveyancer.

Slaven was born at Bulawayo in Southern Rhodesia in March 1931. He later studied in England at Lincoln College at the University of Oxford as a Rhodes Scholar. While studying at Oxford, he made two appearances in first-class cricket for Oxford University against Gloucestershire and Lancashire at Oxford in 1955.

After graduating from Oxford, he returned to Southern Rhodesia where he became a conveyancer. Slaven died at Bulawayo in September 2007. His brother, Michael, also played first-class cricket.

References

External links

1931 births
2007 deaths
Sportspeople from Bulawayo
Zimbabwean Rhodes Scholars
Alumni of Lincoln College, Oxford
Zimbabwean cricketers
Oxford University cricketers
20th-century Zimbabwean lawyers